"Naughty" is the debut single by Australian recording artist Elen Levon, featuring Israel Cruz. It was released digitally on 30 September 2011. The song peaked at number 60 on the ARIA Singles Chart, and number 17 on the ARIA Dance Chart.

Release and promotion
"Naughty" was sent to Australian contemporary hit radio on 5 September 2011. Two weeks later, it became the seventh most added song to radio. "Naughty" was released  digitally on 30 September 2011. It debuted and peaked at number 60 on the ARIA Singles Chart on 10 October 2011. That same week, "Naughty" peaked at number 17 on the ARIA Dance Chart.

Levon performed the song at Erin McNaught's Naughty for Zu shoe collection launch party in Sydney on 5 October 2011. Throughout January 2012, "Naughty" was used in television commercials for the American television series Gossip Girl on Fox8. Levon later performed the song during her Naughty Nights tour with Marvin Priest in February 2012.

Music video
The accompanying music video for "Naughty" premiered online on 28 August 2011. The video features Levon and her backup dancers performing choreographed routines in front of a backdrop of light bulbs. She is also seen singing the song while lying on the floor with her dancers surrounding her, as well as in a chair in front of speakers.

Track listing
Digital download
 "Naughty" (Radio Edit) – 3:21
 "Naughty" (Vandalism V8 Club Mix) – 6:33
 "Naughty" (Rob Pix Remix) – 5:30

Charts

References

2011 debut singles
2011 songs
Elen Levon songs
Ministry of Sound singles
Songs written by Israel Cruz